Sittaung is a village and a historical site in Mon State, Myanmar, located just north of Kyaikkatha.

References

Bibliography
 

Populated places in Mon State